Tampea accepta is a moth of the subfamily Arctiinae first described by Arthur Gardiner Butler in 1877. It is found on Borneo, the Philippines, Sangihe, Sulawesi, Sula Mangoli and the Kei Islands. The habitat consists of lowland forests.

The forewings are dull orange yellow. The hindwings are paler.

References

Lithosiini